Amakhosi may refer to:
Kaizer Chiefs F.C.
Amakhosi Theatre